Antonio López was a merchant steamship that was built in Scotland in 1882 for the Spanish Compañía Transatlántica Española (CTE). A United States Navy auxiliary cruiser sank her in the Spanish–American War when she was trying to run the US blockade to supply materiél to the Spanish garrison on Puerto Rico. She is now the only known Spanish shipwreck in US waters from the war.

Building
William Denny and Brothers built Antonio López in Dumbarton, Scotland, launching her on November 8, 1881 and completing her in 1882. She had a single screw, driven by a two-cylinder compound steam engine that was rated at 634 NHP. CTE named her after its founder Antonio López y López, and registered her at Barcelona.

Loss

In June 1898 Antonio Lopez was bound for San Juan, Puerto Rico from Cádiz. On June 28 two US cruisers fought a squadron of Spanish ships comprising one cruiser, two gunboats and  Antonio López, which had a cargo of military supplies.  pursued and shelled Antonio Lopez, which ran aground at Ensenada Honda.

Claudio López Bru (1853–1925), Antonio López y López' son, then owner and president of the company, sent a telegram to the ship's captain saying:

Es preciso que haga usted llegar el cargamento a Puerto Rico aunque se pierda el barco. (You must get your cargo to Puerto Rico, even if the ship were lost.)

Captain Ramón Acha Caamaño was given charge of salvaging the ship's cargo. His men quickly salved nearly all of it. Only some minor articles and one cannon that had fallen overboard during salvage work were lost.

See also

 Puerto Rican Campaign
 Compañía Transatlántica Española
 Claudio López Bru
 List of United States National Historic Landmarks in United States commonwealths and territories, associated states, and foreign states
 National Register of Historic Places listings in northern Puerto Rico

References

External links

1882 ships
National Register of Historic Places in Dorado, Puerto Rico
National Historic Landmarks in Puerto Rico
Ships built on the River Clyde
Shipwrecks on the National Register of Historic Places
Steamships of Spain
Telegraphy
Spanish–American War ships of Spain
Shipwrecks of the Puerto Rico coast
1898 in Puerto Rico
Maritime incidents in 1898